The Distribution of Industry Act 1945 (8 & 9 Geo. VI c. 36) was an Act of Parliament in the United Kingdom intended to help redevelop areas, such as south-western Scotland, which depended heavily on specific heavy industries, and which had been hard-hit by unemployment in the inter-war period.

Contents
The Act gave the government two main powers, namely:
To schedule "development areas" where the Government was able to build factories for rental to private enterprise, and to manage industrial estates itself
To require that the site for any factory above a certain size should be decided on by discussion between the firm proposing to build it and the Board of Trade.

This plan, mostly prepared by Hugh Dalton, the President of the Board of Trade, was contentious; it was felt by many to be encouraging a planned economy. John Sydney Wardlaw-Milne, a Conservative MP, described it in debate as "the very antithesis of private enterprise ... bureaucracy and Socialism carried to the last limit".

Significance
From June 1945 to January 1950, some 481 government-built and 505 private-built installations (factories, factory extensions, etc.) were built in development areas under the Act, creating an estimated 200,000 jobs (40% of which were taken by women); unemployment in depressed areas fell from 550,000 before the War (July 1938) to under 100,000 in July 1950. A further 279 installations were under construction, with 356 approved but not yet under way; these were predominantly private projects.

In Scotland, projects in the main Scottish Development Area in the central belt created 60,000 jobs by the beginning of 1950, with 15,000 elsewhere in the country; this was expected to rise to 120,000 once planned projects had been completed. Unemployment in the region stood at 41,000 (3½%), compared to 115,000 (12%) before the War. Outside the main development area, major projects included a new industrial estate in Dundee, diversifying local industry away from a dependence on jute, and the Inverness area becoming a scheduled area in 1948, to develop industry in tandem with a new hydro-electric power scheme.

In Wales, most of the industrial areas in South Wales were scheduled as a development area, along with the Wrexham region in the north. 264 installations had been built by May 1950, with 81 under construction and 104 approved; more than half of the factories completed had been Government-funded. Twenty-six of the factories built or planned were intended to provide special employment for those disabled through mining work.

See also
UK labour law

References
Facts and Figures for Socialists, 1951. Labour Party Research Department, London, 1950

United Kingdom Acts of Parliament 1945